The following songs recorded by American pop singer Britney Spears were not released commercially. Some songs have been given to other recording artists for recording. The list encompasses studio-quality recording by Spears that were not commercially or promotionally released by a reputable label, documented demo versions of songs not released in any form, early demo versions of released songs where there is a substantial difference to the released versions (such as completely different melody), and officially commissioned Spears-related professional remix not chosen for release.

Spears has written and recorded material that has never been officially released. Several unreleased songs had been planned for inclusion on her studio albums ...Baby One More Time (1999), Britney (2001), In the Zone (2003), Blackout (2007), Circus (2008), Femme Fatale (2011), ‘’Britney Jean’’ (2013) and Glory (2016), but were ultimately rejected. There are many registered tracks included under the unreleased section that have not been commercially released, but have gained media attention or were confirmed by Spears herself. Many of her unreleased songs have been registered (usually by her company Britney Spears Music) with professional bodies such as the United States Copyright Office, Broadcast Music Incorporated (BMI), and American Society of Composers, Authors and Publishers (ASCAP).

Spears's unreleased material includes songs recorded by her and demo versions, some co-written by artists such as Justin Timberlake and Lady Gaga. In 1997, she recorded "Today", originally meant for Toni Braxton. Snippets of "Rebellion" and "Little Me" were released on Spears's official website in 2006. She has also co-written and recorded songs that were later given to other artists, such as her sister Jamie Lynn Spears, Selena Gomez, and Korean singer BoA. A collection of songs that leaked on October 6, 2011 received the name of "Britmas".

Unreleased songs

References

 Unreleased
Lists of unreleased songs by recording artists